is a Japanese tarento who is represented by the talent agency Horipro. She is a former member of Team S of the female idol group SKE48, and is a former member of its senior group AKB48.

Aside from being an idol, Yamauchi is an avid golfer and has been part of several golf television shows. Her best score so far is 80. She has played from a young age and aimed to become a professional golf player in the future like her parents; Masahiro Kuramoto, a pro golfer who was partnered with her in a pro-am tournament in 2011, commented that she had the potential. One of her mentors was former pro golfer Miho Koga.

On October 7, 2021, Yamauchi announced her graduation from SKE48. She officially graduated from the group on November 30, at the SKE48 Theater.

After graduation, Yamauchi hopes to become a golf coach while continuing entertainment activities as a tarento.

On July 1, 2022, Yamauchi opened her own golf studio, Choco. The golf studio has its own Italian restaurant, BeleMoco.

Discography

Singles
AKB48

SKE48

Albums
AKB48

SKE48

Other

Theater performances

Filmography

Drama

Variety series

Golf series

Stage performances

Radio series

Events

References

External links
 
Horipro official profile 
 

Japanese idols
Japanese women singers
SKE48 members
AKB48 members
1994 births
Living people
Musicians from Chiba Prefecture
Horipro artists